Adolfas is a masculine Lithuanian given name, derived from the German Adolf. Notable people with the name include:

Adolfas Akelaitis (1910–2007), Lithuanian high jumper
Adolfas Aleksejūnas (born 1937), Lithuanian middle-distance runner
Adolfas Jucys (1904–1974), Lithuanian theoretical physicist and mathematician
Adolfas Mekas (1925–2011), Lithuanian film director, and brother of Jonas Mekas
Adolfas Ramanauskas (1918–1957), American-born Lithuanian anti-Soviet partisan
Adolfas Šleževičius (1948-2022), former Prime Minister of Lithuania
Adolfas Tautavičius (born 1925), Lithuanian archaeologist and Habilitated Doctor
Adolfas Urbšas (1900–1973), Lithuanian and Soviet military officer
Adolfas Valeška (1905–1994), Lithuanian stained glass artist, painter, stage designer, and museum director
Adolfas Varanauskas (1934–2007), Lithuanian shot putter
Adolfas Večerskis (born 1949), Lithuanian movie and stage actor, director and translator

See also

 Adolf

Lithuanian masculine given names